Ranolia  (Urdu)" رانولیا" is an administrative unit, known as a Union council of Kohistan in the Khyber Pakhtunkhwa province of Pakistan.
Ranolia is the largest union councel in Kohistan but some political peoples make Ranolia only one unit one union council.

Ranolia has many localities like Ranolia Colony, Ranolia Bazar, Tehsil Banda Ranolia, Khaju Bela, Chechung, Jan Bela, Gheel, Kuzkelay, Zoorkelay, Khanai, Dabrai, Jareen, Dhar Ayam Khel, Takht, Ashial, Thapan, Serai, Dag, Beran, Kokhru, Daan, Bara Kelay, Dhar Merkhan Khel, Dhar Jaya Khel, Soya, Mani, Bela Manekhel, Bhoi, Dhand, Darra Shabay Khel, Darra Domy Khel, Ghundu, Mani Dera, and many mountain area which are called bandas.

Ranolia is divided into five village councils: Banda, Kuzkelay, Barakelay, Darra Shabay Khel, and Dara Domekhel.

Ranolia has a power house named Ranolia Hydro Power Project, with 17 Megawatts.

Ranolia is a rich area in forest and many varieties of dry fruits.

Ranolia has a large bazaar formerly known as Dubair and currently known as Ranolia bazaar. Other bazaars of Ranolia are Kuzkelay, Barakelay and Bela Manekhel bazaar.

Kohistan is divided into three districts: Kohistan Lower, Kohistan Upper, and Koly Palas Kohistan.

Kohistan has four tehsils: Dassu, Pattan, Palas, Kohistan, Kandia and Ranolia tehsil. Each tehsil is composed of union councils, which total 38 in Kohistan.

See also 

 Kohistan District, Pakistan

External links
Khyber-Pakhtunkhwa Government website section on Lower Dir
United Nations
 HAJJ website Uploads
 PBS paiman.jsi.com

Kohistan District, Pakistan
Populated places in Kohistan District, Pakistan
Union councils of Khyber Pakhtunkhwa
Union Councils of Kohistan District, Pakistan